Karl Matthews Arndt (1901–1956) was a member of the White House Council of Economic Advisers. Previously he was an economics professor at the University of Nebraska.

References

1901 births
1956 deaths
United States Council of Economic Advisers
20th-century American economists